The 2021–22 Atlantic Coast Conference women's basketball season began with practices in October 2021, followed by the start of the 2021–22 NCAA Division I women's basketball season in November. Conference play started in November 2021 and will conclude on February 27, 2022.  After the regular season, the 2022 ACC women's basketball tournament will be held at the Greensboro Coliseum in Greensboro, NC for the 22nd time in 23 years.

Head coaches

Coaching changes
 Sue Semrau will return as head coach of Florida State after taking a leave of absence for the 2020–21 season to care for her mother.  Interim Head Coach Brooke Wyckoff will return to her role as Associate Head Coach.
Syracuse head coach Quentin Hillsman resigned amid investigations into allegations of inappropriate behavior on August 2, 2021.  Associate Head Coach Vonn Read was named the interim head coach for the 2021–2022 season on August 4, 2021.

Coaches 

Notes:
 Year at school includes 2021–22 season.
 Overall and ACC records are from time at current school and are through the end the 2020–21 season.
 NCAA Tournament appearances are from time at current school only.
 NCAA Final Fours and Championship include time at other schools

Preseason

Preseason watch lists 
Below is a table of notable preseason watch lists.

ACC Women's Basketball Tip-off 
The Preseason Media Poll and Preseason All-ACC teams were voted on after a tipoff event held at the Charlotte Marriott City Center in Charlotte, North Carolina on October 13, 2021.  At the media day, the head coaches and the Blue Ribbon Panel voted on the finishing order of the teams, an All-ACC team, a Preseason Player of the Year, and Newcomers to watch.  A selected group of student athletes also took questions from the media on this day.

At the media day, both the head coaches and the Blue Ribbon Panel predicted that NC State would be league champion.

ACC preseason polls 

First place votes shown in parenthesis.

Preseason All-ACC Teams 

Preseason Player of the Year votes shown in parenthesis.

Preseason ACC Player of the Year

Newcomer Watchlist

Regular season

Records against other conferences
2021–22 records against non-conference foes as of (April 1, 2022):

Regular Season

Post Season

Record against ranked non-conference opponents
This is a list of games against ranked opponents only (rankings from the AP Poll):

Team rankings are reflective of AP poll when the game was played, not current or final ranking

† denotes game was played on neutral site

Rankings

Note: The Coaches Poll releases a final poll after the NCAA tournament, but the AP Poll does not release a poll at this time.  Coaches poll did not release a poll when the AP released its week 2 poll.

Conference Matrix
This table summarizes the head-to-head results between teams in conference play. Each team played 18 conference games, and at least 1 against each opponent. The conference returned to an 18-game schedule after playing 20 games last season due to the COVID-19 pandemic.

Player of the week
Throughout the conference regular season, the Atlantic Coast Conference offices named a Player(s) of the week and a Rookie(s) of the week.

Postseason

ACC tournament

NCAA tournament

National Invitation tournament

Honors and awards

ACC Awards 

The ACC announced its end of season awards on March 1, 2022 ahead of the start of the ACC tournament.

WNBA Draft 

The ACC had seven players selected in the WNBA Draft.  This was the seventeenth consecutive year the league had a player selected, which is the longest of any conference.  Their seven players tied for the most players selected from a single conference selected in the draft.

References